The Parc naturel régional de Carmargue is a protected area which was designated in 1970 along the shoreline of the Camargue, France.
The park protects a wetland environment and an adjacent marine area. The boundaries of the park have been expanded to include a lagoon called the Étang de Vaccarès.  

The Camargue is also the site of a national nature reserve, and has been designated by UNESCO as a biosphere reserve.

Twinning
The park is twinned with a Spanish wetland, the Doñana National Park at the mouth of the Guadalquivir.  The two parks share a number of characteristics including significance for bird-life and semi-feral horses, and proximity to a pilgrimage site (Saintes-Maries-de-la-Mer and the Hermitage of El Rocío).

In 1992, the site was formally twinned with the Danube Delta Biosphere Reserve Ramsar site by an agreement between the governments of Romania and France. Ramsar site no. 521.

See also 
 Camargue cattle
 Camargue equitation
 Camargue horse
 Gardian
 Manade

References

External links
 Camargue, a delta and its people.
 Parcs naturels régionaux de France, Camargue

Geography of Bouches-du-Rhône
Camargue
Biosphere reserves of France
Carmargue
Marine reserves
Tourist attractions in Bouches-du-Rhône